"Yesterdays" is the third track on the Guns N' Roses album Use Your Illusion II. It was written by Axl Rose, West Arkeen, Del James and Billy McCloud. This song is featured in the 2004 compilation Greatest Hits, and the Vegas version below was included on the album Live Era '87–'93. The song reached number eight on the UK Singles Chart and peaked at number 72 on the US Billboard Hot 100.

Music video
The official music video for the song was directed by Andy Morahan. Filmed in black and white, the first version featured the band playing in an empty warehouse. The second version mixes clips of the band playing in the warehouse and photographs of band members during the Use Your Illusion Tour, as well as former members Izzy Stradlin and Steven Adler, who had left the group by then. It is included on their Welcome to the Videos DVD.

Track listings

Personnel
 W. Axl Rose – lead vocals, piano
 Slash – lead guitar
 Izzy Stradlin – rhythm guitar
 Duff McKagan – bass guitar
 Matt Sorum – drums
 Dizzy Reed – organ

Charts

Weekly charts

Year-end charts

References

1991 songs
1992 singles
Geffen Records singles
Guns N' Roses songs
Music videos directed by Andy Morahan
Song recordings produced by Mike Clink
Songs written by Axl Rose
Songs written by Del James
Songs written by West Arkeen
Black-and-white music videos